Pycnanthemum is a genus of herbaceous plants in the mint family (Lamiaceae).  Species in this genus are often referred to as "mountain mints" and they often have a minty or thyme-like aroma when crushed.  All species of Pycnanthemum are native to the United States and Canada. The center of diversity for the genus is North Carolina with 13 of the 20 species having been collected therein.  Nineteen of the 20 species of Pycnanthemum occur in the Eastern US and Canada, and one disjunct species (P. californicum) occurs in California and Oregon.

Pycnanthemum belongs to the true mint subtribe (Menthinae), and it has been shown to be closely related to the Monarda, Blephilia, and the scrub mints of the Southeastern United States. Relationships within the genus remain unresolved.  A complicated history of polyploidization paired with cryptic morphologies makes this a challenging group for systematists.

Species
 Pycnanthemum albescens  – white-leaved mountainmint – south-central US
 Pycnanthemum beadlei  – North Carolina, South Carolina, Virginia, eastern Tennessee, northern Georgia
 Pycnanthemum californicum Torr. ex Durand – Sierra mint – California
 Pycnanthemum clinopodioides Torr. & A.Gray – mid-Atlantic States, Tennessee, Indiana
 Pycnanthemum curvipes  – southeastern US
 Pycnanthemum flexuosum  – southeastern US
 Pycnanthemum floridanum  – Florida mountainmint – Florida, southern Georgia
 Pycnanthemum incanum  –  hoary mountainmint, hoary basil, wild basil – Ontario, most of US east of the Mississippi River
 Pycnanthemum loomisii  – Loomis' mountainmint – southeastern US, Ohio Valley
 †Pycnanthemum monotrichum Fernald  – Virginia but extinct
 Pycnanthemum montanum  – southern Appalachians 
 Pycnanthemum muticum  – short-toothed mountainmint – much of eastern US from east Texas to southern Maine
 Pycnanthemum nudum Nutt. – Coastal Plain mountainmint – southeastern US
 Pycnanthemum pilosum  ( = P. verticillatum var. pilosum) – hairy mountainmint, whorled mountainmint
 Pycnanthemum pycnanthemoides  – southern mountainmint – southeastern US, Ohio Valley
 Pycnanthemum setosum  – awned mountainmint – southeastern + mid-Atlantic US
 Pycnanthemum tenuifolium  – little-leaved mountainmint, slender-leaved mountainmint (= P. flexuosum ) – Quebec, Ontario, eastern + central US
 Pycnanthemum torreyi  – Torrey's mountainmint – eastern + east-central US
 Pycnanthemum verticillatum  – whorled mountainmint – Quebec, Ontario, eastern + central US
 Pycnanthemum virginianum   – Virginia mountainmint – Quebec, Ontario, eastern + central US

Footnotes

References
  (2007): Germplasm Resources Information Network – Pycnanthemum. Version of 2007-OCT-05. Retrieved 2011-FEB-18.

External links

Barbara Pleasant.  The Herb Companion: Herb-To-Know: Mountain Mint.
 Jeffrey S. Pippen Duke University. North Carolina Wildflowers, Shrubs, & Trees: Pycnanthemum.
 Henriette's Herbal Homepage: Pycnanthemum.

 
Lamiaceae genera
Flora of North America